Shumwayite is a rare but relatively simple uranyl sulfate mineral with the formula (UO2)2(SO4)2•5H2O. It was discovered in the Green Lizard and Giveaway-Simplot mines of the White Canyon mining district, San Juan County, Utah, US.

Relation to other minerals
The structure of shumwayite is unique. Somewhat chemically similar natural uranyl sulfates include jáchymovite, metauranopilite and uranopilite.

References

Sulfate minerals
Uranium(VI) minerals
Monoclinic minerals
Minerals in space group 14